Zsigmond Járai (born 29 December 1951) is a Hungarian politician, who served as Minister of Finance between 1998 and 2000. He was the President of the Budapest Stock Exchange between 1996 and 1998. After his ministership he was appointed President of the Hungarian National Bank. Járai was succeeded by András Simor in 2007.

Honours
 Honorary Knight Grand Cross of the Most Excellent Order of the British Empire

References

Életrajz a vokscentrum.hu portálon
Járai: a miniszterelnök behúzott a csőbe – interjú az Inforádiónak
Járai Zsigmond, a GKI és a számok

1951 births
Living people
People from Hajdú-Bihar County
Finance ministers of Hungary
Governors of the Hungarian National Bank
Honorary Knights Grand Cross of the Order of the British Empire